William Grosvenor, 3rd Duke of Westminster (23 December 1894 – 22 February 1963), was the son of Lord Henry George Grosvenor and a grandson of Hugh Grosvenor, 1st Duke of Westminster. His mother, Dora Mina Erskine-Wemyss, was the daughter of James Erskine Wemyss, and a great-granddaughter of William IV.

He was brain-damaged at birth. After the death of his mother, he lived with his stepmother, the former Rosamund Angharad Lloyd, in a small house in the south of England. After her death he lived in another house in Bath with a carer.

The Duke died in 1963 at the age of 68, unmarried and childless. He is buried in the churchyard of Eccleston Church near Eaton Hall, Cheshire. His titles passed to his cousin Gerald Grosvenor.

References

External links

3rd Duke of Westminster

1894 births
1963 deaths
3
People from Cheshire
William Grosvenor, 3rd Duke of Westminster